Greensleeves Rhythm Album #88: Warning is an album in Greensleeves Records' rhythm album series.  It was released in June 2008 on CD and LP.  The album features various artists recorded over the "Warning" riddim, produced by Shane Brown (Jukeboxx Crew) and Collin Edwards (aka Demarco).

Track listing
"Dem Nuh Bad" - Bounty Killer
"Hey Girl" - Busy Signal
"Sort Dem Out" - Demarco
"Too Much" - Serani
"Money Changer" - Mavado
"Wanted" - Munga
"Loaded" - Busy Signal
"Gi Dem Hard" - Elephant Man
"Love Many Man" - Delly Ranx
"Show Off" - Bling Dawg
"From Yu Par" - Wayne Marshall
"Nah Change" - Voicemail
"Battlefield" - Bling Dawg
"Warning Rhythm" - Shane Brown & Demarco
"Warning Megamix" - mixed by DJ Kenny

Reggae compilation albums
2008 compilation albums
Greensleeves Records albums